Inivalappil Mani Vijayan (born 25 April 1969), also known by the nickname Kalo Harin (Blackbuck), is a former professional football player who also captained the India national football team. He played as a striker, where he formed a successful attacking partnership with Bhaichung Bhutia for the India national football team in the late nineties and early 2000s. Vijayan was crowned Indian Player of the Year in 1993, 1997 and 1999, the first player to win the award multiple times. He was also awarded the Arjuna Award in 2003.

Vijayan started his career with the Kerala Police football club and rose to become one of the top names in domestic football. A highly aggressive player, he eventually became the highest earner in Indian club football as well as a regular choice in the Indian team. He scored one of the fastest ever international goals in a match against Bhutan in the 1999 SAF Games, where he managed to score in 12 seconds after kickoff.

Vijayan's talents attracted interest from the clubs in Malaysia and Thailand, although he spent his entire career in India until retirement. By the end of his career he had scored 34 international goals in 71 matches for India. Since retiring from international football, Vijayan has set up a football academy to train young players in his home town. He was the captain of Indian team from 2000 to 2004.

Vijayan has also acted in some notable roles in many movies. One of his movies, Mmmmm was shortlisted for India's entry into the 93rd Academy Awards.

Early life and domestic career

Vijayan was born into a Malayali Family on 25 April 1969 at Thrissur City, Kerala. He began his life in a gravely poor environment, and had to sell soda bottles in the Thrissur Municipal Corporation Stadium to help his family. Vijayan started out as a soda seller in the Thrissur Municipal Corporation Stadium, Kerala earning 10 paise. (0.02 Cents) a bottle He studied in Church Mission Society High School, Thrissur (CMSHSS, Thrissur). He had passion for the game of football, and somehow caught the eye of the then DGP of Kerala, M.K. Joseph who got him selected for the Kerala Police football club at 17 years of age. Vijayan delivered brilliant performances for Kerala Police at Quilon Nationals 1987, and was able to impress the national football fraternity very soon with his impeccable skills and highly aggressive style of playing. He continued to play for Kerala Police until 1991. He then joined Mohun Bagan, before coming back to Kerala Police in 1992 and then switching back to Mohun Bagan the very next year for a second spell at the club. In 1994, he joined JCT Mills Phagwara, and stayed with them for 3 more years until 1997, when he left JCT to join FC Kochin. After spending a one year tenure with the club, he moved once more to Mohun Bagan in 1998, his third spell with the club, and then returned to FC Kochin in 1999.

In August 2000, during the off-season, Vijayan joined Bangladeshi Dhaka Premier Division League club Muktijoddha Sangsad and appeared in five league matches, while the lack of international transfer certificate behind the signing caused a fine of 50,000 rupees by the All India Football Federation in March 2001. He rejoined FC Kochin later and played until 2001. He later signed with East Bengal, before leaving in 2002 to join JCT Mills Phagwara once more. After finishing a two-year stint with the club, he left JCT in 2004 and joined Churchill Brothers S.C. He left the club after one year and joined East Bengal in 2005, which was his last professional football club as an active football player. He left East Bengal in 2006. In the 2020–21 season, Vijayan appeared with Gokulam Kerala's futsal team.

International career

I.M. Vijayan made his debut in international football in the year 1992 and played in a number of tournaments such as Nehru Cup, Pre-Olympics, FIFA World Qualifiers, SAFF Championship and SAF Games. Vijayan and Bhaichung Bhutia formed one of the deadliest forward lines the Indian Football team had ever seen, and helped the team score various vital goals in international tournaments. Vijayan was part of the victorious Indian team in the 1999 South Asian Football Federation Cup and scored one of the fastest international goals in history of sport during the tournament, hitting the net against Bhutan after only 12 seconds. He also finished top scorer in the Afro-Asian Games event held in India in 2003 with four goals. Vijayan formally retired from international football after the Afro-Asian Games of 2003.

International statistics

Honours

India
SAFF Championship: 1993, 1997, 1999; third place: 2003
 South Asian Games Gold medal: 1995; Silver medal: 1993; Bronze medal: 1999

Individual
Arjuna Award: 2003
AIFF Player of the Year: 1992, 1997, 2000
Nehru Cup Best Player: 1993
SAARC Gold Cup top scorer: 1993
Nominated for Padma Shri: 2020
Doctorate from Northern State Medical University, Arkhangelsk, Russia.

Kalo Harin
A biographical film, titled Kalo Harin and directed by Cherian Joseph, was released in 1998. The title translates as blackbuck and is a reference to Vijayan's popular nickname during his playing days.

Acting career
After retiring from football, Vijayan started his acting career. His debut was through playing the lead role in the film Shantham, directed by Jayaraj. Later on, he went to act more than 20 films, in Malayalam & Tamil. In 2021, the movie 'Mmmmm' (sound of pain), starring Vijayan in the lead role was shortlisted as one of India's official entries for the Oscars.

Shantham
 Thimiru (Tamil Film)
Asuravithu
Bachelor Party
Quotation
Shyaamam
Mahasamudram
Kisan
Gethu (Tamil Film)
Akashathile Paravakal
Komban (Tamil Film)
The Great Father
Mattancherry
Ben Johnson
Abrahaminte Santhathikal
Mythili Veendum Varunnu
Shyaamam
Prakruthi
Ganesha Meendum Santhipom (Tamil Film)
Porinju Mariam Jose
Bigil (Tamil Film)
Muddy
Siddy
The Teacher
Anaparambile Worldcup

Family
Vijayan is married to Raji.
He has 3 children:
Aromal Vijayan, Archana Vijayan and Abhirami Vijayan. He has a son in law, Abdul Aadil, and a granddaughter named Adeeva.

Other activities
In 2004, he started a sports equipment company named "Boxer Sports Goods Company (BSGC)" in Thrissur.

After retirement from active football, Vijayan concentrated his attention upon his football School that he had opened in Thrissur.

He was also a member of the now defunct National Congress (Indira). In 2010, Vijayan formally took over a coaching job with Southern Samity, a premier division side in the Calcutta Football League. In March 2017, the Ministry of Youth Affairs and Sports, Government of India, appointed Vijayan as the national observer for football. In October 2018, Vijayan announced that he is starting a film production company called 'Bigdaddy Entertainment' jointly with his friends, which will be mainly revolving around football.

In January 2017, Vijayan officially unveiled the club crest of newly formed I-League club Gokulam. In February 2021, Vijayan was appointed as the director of Kerala Police Football Academy, a new police football academy, which is going to be set up in Malappuram.

On 2 September 2022, Vijayan was elected as a member of the technical committee of the All India Football Federation.

See also 

 AIFF Player of the Year
 List of India national football team hat-tricks
 List of India national football team captains

References

Bibliography

External links

 I. M. Vijayan Official Website
 Indian legends profile
 
 
 Interview with Vijayan in Malayalam
 I.M. Vijayan - Movies

1969 births
Footballers from Thrissur
Indian footballers
India international footballers
Living people
Male actors from Thrissur
Recipients of the Arjuna Award
FC Kochin players
East Bengal Club players
Muktijoddha Sangsad KC players
Male actors in Malayalam cinema
Indian male film actors
Footballers at the 1998 Asian Games
Association football forwards
Expatriate footballers in Bangladesh
Indian expatriate footballers
21st-century Indian male actors
Asian Games competitors for India
South Asian Games medalists in football
South Asian Games gold medalists for India
South Asian Games silver medalists for India
South Asian Games bronze medalists for India